Joffre Peter Jock Tradd (or Trad) (1922–2000) was an Australian rugby league footballer who played in the 1940s.

Playing career
Tradd came to the St. George club from the N.S.W, South Coast for one season in 1946. A handy lock-forward, he was noted for his defensive game. Injuries disrupted his season with only limited appearances for the Red V. He trialled with the North Sydney club in 1947, before finishing his career as Captain/coach of the Gerringong rugby league club in 1950.

War service
Tradd also enlisted in the Australian Army in World War II.

Death
Tradd died on 7 June 2000 in Warrawong, New South Wales age 77.

References

Australian rugby league players
St. George Dragons players
1922 births
2000 deaths
Australian military personnel of World War II
Rugby league players from Sydney
Rugby league locks